Adelphobates quinquevittatus (Rio Madeira poison frog or more ambiguously, Amazonian poison frog) is a species of frog in the family Dendrobatidae found in the Rio Madeira drainage in the southern Amazon Basin in Brazil and Bolivia. Most records of this species before 1990 refer to Ranitomeya ventrimaculata.
Its natural habitats are tropical moist lowland forests, freshwater marshes, and intermittent freshwater marshes. It is threatened by habitat loss.

References

External links

Adelphobates
Amphibians described in 1864
Amphibians of Bolivia
Amphibians of Brazil
Taxonomy articles created by Polbot